Andrey Zhilkin (born 9 March 1995) is a Russian swimmer. He competed in the men's 4 × 100 metre freestyle relay event at the 2018 European Aquatics Championships, winning the gold medal.

References

External links
 

1995 births
Living people
Russian male swimmers
Russian male freestyle swimmers
European Aquatics Championships medalists in swimming
Universiade silver medalists for Russia
Universiade medalists in swimming
Medalists at the 2017 Summer Universiade
Swimmers at the 2020 Summer Olympics